List of ambassadors of Canada to France – the diplomatic mission of Canada to the French Republic is based at the Embassy of Canada in Paris. It is the second-oldest Canadian diplomatic post, the oldest being the Canadian High Commission in London. Technically, however, Paris is Canada's oldest foreign mission, since the diplomatic posting to London was not considered to be a "foreign" mission because Canada was a member of the British Empire.

The official residence of the Canadian ambassador is located at 135 rue du Faubourg Saint-Honoré in the 8th arrondissement of Paris. The building is known as the Hôtel de Rigny and was purchased by the Canadian government in 1950.

History
The mission in Paris was established in 1882, when Hector Fabre was sent to serve as an "Agent of the Dominion (of Canada)". He was accorded no formal diplomatic status, however, as Britain had not accorded Canada the right to establish formal diplomatic relations with foreign states. 

In 1891, Fabre was succeeded by Senator Philippe Roy as Canada's Agent in France. Canada opened a formal legation in Paris in 1928, at which point Roy was accorded the title of Envoy Extraordinary and Minister Plenipotentiary and given diplomatic privileges. 
 
George Philias Vanier was Minister and Head of Legation from 1939 to 1940 (he was concurrently Canada's High Commissioner to the United Kingdom), and he was named Canada's first Ambassador to France in September 1944.

List of envoys

References

External links
 Embassy of Canada in France
 Former Canadian Ambassadors to France

France
 
Canada